The Philadelphia Business Journal is a diversified business media company in Philadelphia, Pennsylvania, publishing daily stories on its website and social networks, and a weekly edition available in print and online. It is published by the American City Business Journals.

See also
List of newspapers in Pennsylvania

References

External links

Business newspapers published in the United States
Newspapers published in Philadelphia